De La Savane station is a Montreal Metro station in the borough of Côte-des-Neiges–Notre-Dame-de-Grâce in Montreal, Quebec, Canada. It is operated by the Société de transport de Montréal (STM) and serves the Orange Line. It is located in the Côte-des-Neiges area on the border of the town of Mount Royal.It opened on January 9, 1984.

Overview 

The station is a normal side platform station with an entrance at the north end. It was planned in such a way as to allow an additional entrance to be built on the other side of the Décarie Autoroute, but this has not yet happened. As it is the station with the fewest passengers, a redevelopment plan for the area is under discussion.

The station was designed by Guy de Varennes and Almas Mathieu. Its artworks include mural treatments in the entrance, mezzanine, and platforms by the architects, as well as a large metal sculpture by Maurice Lemieux, entitled Calcite, affixed to the wall of the mezzanine and illuminated by a light shaft.

Origin of the name
This station is named for the nearby rue de la Savane, a connector street between the Decarie expressway and Jean Talon Street.

Connecting bus routes

With the reopening of Côte-Vertu station on August 23, 2021, the 64, 470 and 968 went back to the regular route at Côte-Vertu station. On the same day, the 76 McArthur is discontinued and the 100 Crémazie and the 460 Express Métropolitaine serve Du Collège station on the westbound and De la Savane station on the eastbound.

Nearby points of interest
Décarie Autoroute
Metropolitan Autoroute
Baron de Hirsch Jewish Cemetery
Centre commercial VMR
Centre d'emploi du Canada

References

External links
De La Savane station  - official web page
 De La Savane metro station geo location
Montreal by Metro, metrodemontreal.com
 2011 STM System Map
 Metro Map

Orange Line (Montreal Metro)
Railway stations in Canada opened in 1984
Côte-des-Neiges–Notre-Dame-de-Grâce